This is a list of compositions by composer, orchestrator and conductor Ennio Morricone. He composed and arranged scores for more than 400 film and television productions. Morricone was considered one of the most influential and best-selling film composers since the late 1940s.

He has sold well over 70 million records worldwide, including 6.5 million albums and singles in France, over three million in the United States and more than two million albums in Korea.

In 1971, the composer received his first golden record (disco d'oro) for the sale of 1,000,000 records in Italy and a "Targa d'Oro" for the worldwide sales of 22 million.

His score for Sergio Leone's Once Upon a Time in the West is one of the top 5 best-selling original instrumental scores in the world today, with about 10 million copies sold.

His score for The Mission (1986) was also at one point the world's best selling score. Morricone's music for The Good, the Bad and the Ugly (1966) and Le Professionnel (1981) each sold over 3 million copies worldwide.

Filmography

1950s

1960s

1970s

1980s

1990s

2000s

2010s

Television films and series

1960s

1970s

1980s

1990s

2000s

Stage productions 
 Il Lieto fine (Luciano Salce, 1959)
 Il Pappa Reale (Luciano Salce, 1960)
 Non approfondire (Enzo Trapani, 1961)
 La Chasse aux corbeaux (Anton Giulio Majano, 1962)
 Rascelinaria (Pietro Garinei, Sandro Giovannini, 1962)
 Filumena Marturano (2010)

Radio productions 
 Ventimila leghe sotto i mari (Francesco Ghedini, 1961)
 Tiempe d'ammore (Fausto Cigliano, Achille Millo, 1961)

Advertising campaigns 

Since 1984, Ennio Morricone composed original background music to several advertising campaigns. Most of the commercials were directed by Giuseppe Tornatore.

Selected films with music by Morricone

Classic (absolute) music 
Ennio Morricone's classical compositions include over 15 piano concertos, a trumpet concerto, 30 symphonic pieces, choral music, one opera and one mass. His first classical pieces date back to the late forties. 

 Il Mattino (for voice and piano) 1946
 Imitazione (for voice and piano) 1947
 Iintimità (for voice and piano) 1947
 Barcarola funebre (for piano) 1952
 Preludio a una Novella senza titolo (for piano) 1952
 Distacco I (for voice and piano) 1953
 Distacco II (for voice and piano) 1953
 Verrà la morte (for contralto and piano) 1953
 Oboe sommerso (for baritone and five instruments) 1953
 Musica (for piano and string orchestra) 1954
 Sonata (for brass ensemble, piano and timpani) 1954
 Variations on a theme by Frescobaldi (for piano) 1955
 Cantata (for orchestra and mixed chorus singing a text by Cesare Pavese) 1955
 Sestetto (for flute, oboe, bassoon, violin, viola and cello) 1955
 Twelve Variations (for oboe d'amore, cello and piano) 1956
 Invenzione, canone e ricercare (for piano) 1956
 Concerto (for orchestra) 1957
 Distanze (for violin, cello and piano) 1958
 Requiem per un destino (for mixed chorus and orchestra) 1966
 Suoni per Dino (a piece for viola virtuoso Dino Asciolla using 2 magnetic tapes) 1969
 Proibito (for 8 trumpets) 1972
 Gestazione (for female voice and instruments plus pre-recorded electronic sounds and an ad lib string orchestra) 1980
 Totem secondo (for 5 bassoons and 2 contrabassoons) 1981
 Second Concerto (for flute, cello and orchestra) 1984–85
 Four Studies (for piano) 1984–89
 Frammenti di Eros (Cantata for soprano, piano and orchestra to a text by Sergio Miceli) 1985
 Cantata per L'Europa (for soprano, two vocal recitals, mixed chorus and orchestra) 1988
 Mordenti (for harpsichord) 1988
 Epos (for orchestra) 1989
 Study (for double-bass) 1989
 Reflessi (for cello) 1989–90
 Frammenti di giochi (for violin and harp) 1990
 Third Concerto (for guitar, marimba and string orchestra) 1990–91
 UT (for trumpet, timpani, bass drum and string orchestra) dedicated to his friend trumpet player Mauro Maur 1991
 Una via crucis ('Stations of The Cross' in various vocal and instrumental combinations and in collaboration with Michele Dall'Ongaro and Egisto Macchi)
 Fourth Concerto (for organ, two trumpets, two trombones and orchestra) 1993
 Vidi aquam (for soprano and small orchestra) 1993
 Elegia per Egisto (a piece for violin dedicated to his fellow-Nuova Consonanza member Egisto Macchi) 1993
 Il silenzio, il gioco, la memoria (for a chorus of children's voices singing a text by Sergio Miceli) 1994
 Partenope (an opera with a libretto by Guido Barbieri and Sandro Cappelletto) 1996
 Passaggio secondo (for flute, oboe, clarinet, bassoon, French horn, 20 strings and a vocal recital of a text by Allen Ginsberg) 1996
 Scherzo (for violin and piano) 1996; Ombra di lontana presenza (for viola, string orchestra and magnetic tape) 1997
 Nocturne and Passacaglia (for flute, oboe, clarinet, piano and strings) 1998
 Amen (for 6 choruses of mixed voices) 1998
 Pietre (for double chorus, percussion and cello) 1999
 For the Children Killed by the Mafia (for soprano, baritone, 6 instruments and two voices reciting a text by Luciano Violente) 1999
 Abenddämmerung (for violin, cello, piano and soprano or mezzo-soprano singing a text by Heinrich Heine) 2000
 If This Is a Man (for soprano, violin, strings and vocal recital of a text by Primo Levi) 2001
 Voci dal silenzio (for vocal recital, recorded voice, chorus and orchestra) 2002
 Finale (for two organs) 2002
 Riverberi (for flute, cello and piano) 2004
 Missa Papae Francisci (mass for double chorus, orchestra and organ) 2015
 Per i 40 anni (for mixed ensemble) 2020

Live albums 

 Ennio Morricone live (with Metropole Orchestra) (1987)
 Concerto Premio Nino Rota (1995)
 Ennio Morricone – Live (1995)
 Morricone dirige a Morricone (1998)
 Cinema Concerto: Ennio Morricone at Santa Cecilia (1999)
 Verona Arena Concerto (2002)
 La leggenda della pianista (2003)
 Focus: Ennio Morricone & Dulce Pontes (2004)
 Voci dal silenzio (2004)
 Morricone Conducts Morricone: The Munich Concert 2004 (2006)
 Note di Pace/Peace Notes: Live at Piazza San Marco, Venice (2008)
 Giorgio Armani presents Musica per il cinema (2CD)(2012)

Studio albums

with Gruppo di Improvvisazione di Nuova Consonanza 

 1966 "Nuova Consonanza", LP RCA
 1967 "The Private Sea of Dreams" (as Il Gruppo), LP RCA Victor
 1968 "Improvisationen" LP Deutsche Grammophon
 1970 "The Feed-back" (as The Group), LP RCA
 1973 "Improvvisazioni a Formazioni Variate" (also known as "Gruppo d'Improvvisazione Nuova Consonanza"), LP General Music
 1975 "Nuova Consonanza", LP Cinevox Records. Reissue 2007 CD Bella Casa
 1976 "Musica su Schemi", LP Cramps Records. Reissue 2002: LP Get Back, CD Ampersand
 1992 "1967–1975", CD Edition RZ
 2006 "Azioni", CD Die Schachtel
 2010 "Niente", CD Cometa Edizioni Musicali. Reissue 2012 LP The Omni Recording Corporation/The Roundtable
 2011 "Eroina", CD Cometa Edizioni Musicali

with Mauro Maur 

 La Tromba Classica Contemporanea (1993, Mauro Maur & Ennio Morricone)
 In the Line of Fire (1993, Mauro Maur & Ennio Morricone)
 Mauro Maur e i suoi Solisti (1996, Mauro Maur & Ennio Morricone)

with Chico Buarque 

 Per un pugno di samba (1970, Chico Buarque & Ennio Morricone)
 Sonho de um Carnaval (2000, Chico Buarque & Ennio Morricone)
 De sa terra a su xelu (2002, Clara Murtas & Ennio Morricone)

other 

 Guardians of the clouds (2007, Carel Kraayenhof & Ennio Morricone)
 Paradiso (2011, Hayley Westenra & Ennio Morricone)
 Morricone.Uncovered (2012, Romina Arena & Ennio Morricone)
 Morricone 60 (2016, Ennio Morricone & Czech National Symphony Orchestra)

Selected compilations 

 Morricone: Belmondo (1971)
 Take off: Film Hits (1978)
 Oscar Valdambrini (1982)
 His Greatest Themes (1986)
 Film Music, Vol. 1: The Collection (1987)
 Film Music, Vol. 2 (1988)
 Once Upon a Time in the West: 20 Famous Film Tracks of Ennio Morricone (1989)
 Zijn Grootste Successen (1990)
 Chamber Music (1990)
 The Legendary Italian Westerns (1990)
 Original Film Musik Von Ennio Morricone (1993)
 93 Movie Sounds (1994)
 Classic Ennio Morricone (1994)
 Spaghetti Western: The Ennio Morricone Collection (1995)
 The Ennio Morricone Anthology: A Fistful of Film Music (1995)
 An Ennio Morricone: Dario Argento Trilogy (1995)
 Anthology: Main Titles & Rare Tracks (1995)
 With Love: Music Composed & Conducted By (1995)
 Neapolitan Songs (1995)
 Best of Ennio Morricone (BMG) (1995)
 Love Themes (1995)
 Film Hits (1995)
 Western Movie Themes from Clint Eastwood Movies (1995)
 Film Festival (1995)
 Movie Classics: The Music of Ennio Morricone & Hugo Montenegro (1996)
 TV Film Music (1996)
 Time of Adventure (1996)
 Main Titles, Vol. 1 (1965–1995) (1996)
 Magic World of Ennio Morricone (1996)
 Once Upon a Time in the Cinema (1996)
 Time for Suspense (1996)
 Fear According to Morricone (1997)
 Singles Collection, Vol. 2 (1997)
 Film Music by Ennio Morricone (Disky) (1998)
 Movie Classics (1998)
 Ennio Morricone Songbook, Vol. 2: Western Songs & Ballads (1998)
 Mondo Morricone (1999)
 1966–1987 (1999)
 Love Themes (1999)
 Main Titles, Vol. 3: 1965–1985 (1999)
 With Love, Vol. 2 (1999)
 The Gangster Collection (1999)
 Morricone 2000 (1999)
 The Thriller Collection (1999)
 Once Upon a Time in the West (Compilation) (1999)
 Selections from Chronicle (1999)
 Genius of Ennio Morricone (2000)
 The Very Best of Ennio Morricone (2000)
 Psycho Morricone (2001)
 40th Commemoration: Ultimate Soundtracks Collection (2001)
 40th Commemoration: Ultimate Italian Pops Collection (2001)
 40th Commemoration: Ultimate Mood Music Collection (2001)
 Mondo Morricone Revisited, Vol. 1 (2002)
 More Mondo Morricone Revisited, Vol. 2 (2002)
 Molto Mondo Morricone, Vol. 3 (2002)
 Morricone in the Scene: Chase Morricone (2002)
 Bizarre Morricone (2002)
 Lounge Morricone (2002)
 Notte Morricone (2002)
 Vivid Sound (2002)
 Signor Morricone Tempo (2002)
 Psichedelico Jazzistico (2004)
 Erotica Morricone: So Sweet So Sensual (2004)
 Casa Della Musica (2004)
 A Celebration of Ennio Morricone's 75th Anniversary (2004)
 Great Melodies of Ennio Morricone (2004)
 Movie Masterpieces (2004)
 Morricone Aromatico (2004)
 Once Upon a Time... The Essential Ennio Morricone (2004)
 Film Music Maestro (2004)
 The Best of Ennio Morricone (Setteottavi) (2005)
 Morricone Happening (2005)
 Most Famous Hits (2005)
 Morricone Kill: Spaghetti Western Magic from the Maestro (2005)
 Morricone High (2005)
 Morricone in Love (2005)
 Maestro (2005)
 Crime and Dissonance (2005)
 Itinerary of a Genius (2005)
 Bandes Originales de Film (2005)
 The Library, Vol. 1 (Musiche Composte Per il Cinema) (2005)
 My Favorite Ennio Morricone Music (2005)
 Ennio Morricone Deluxe (2006)
 Il West di Morricone (2006)
 Una Storia Italiana (2006)
 Most Famous Hits: Ennio Morricone – Western Film Music: The Album (2006)
 Gold Collection (2006)
 Film Music by Ennio Morricone (Silva Screen) (2006)
 Morricone Award (2007)
 Morricone: Western (2007)
 Grand Collection (2007)
 World of Ennio Morricone (2007)
 Ennio Morricone (2007)
 The Soundtracks: 75 Themes from 53 Films (2007)
 50 Movie Theme Hits: Gold Edition, Vol. 2 (2007)
 In Lounge (2007)
 Original Songs (2007)
 Morricone Award (CD + Book) (2007)
 Made In France (2007)
 Un'ora Con Ennio Morricone (2007)
 Edda Dell'Orso performs Ennio Morricone (2 CD) (2008)
 In Lounge, Vol. 2 (2008)
 The Platinum Collection: Original Soundtrack (2008)
 Morricone In The Brain (2009)
 Ennio Morricone Earbook 4 CD (2013)
 Cinema collection – I 30 capolavori della musica da film italiana (2013)
 L'essentiel d'Ennio Morricone (2013)
 The Ennio Morricone Pop Collection, Vol. 1 (2013)
 The Ennio Morricone Pop Collection, Vol. 2 (2013)

Remix albums 

 Ennio Morricone Remixes Vol.1 - 3-LP / CD (2003)
 Ennio Morricone Remixes Vol.2 - 3-LP (2 CD) (2004)
 Ennio Morricone Remixes - limited 7

Box sets 

 Ennio Morricone Chronicles 1959-1999 (1999, 10 CD Box)
 Io (2003, 4CD Box)
 Ennio Morricone OST (2003, 4CD Box)
 Mondo Morricone: The Trilogy (2004, 3CD Box)
 Ultimate Morricone Collection (2006, 24CD Box)
 The Complete Dollars Trilogy (2008, 4CD Box)
 The Complete Edition (2008, 15CD Box)

DVDs 

 Man & His Music (2004)
 Morricone conducts Morricone (2006)
 Arena Concerto (2007)
 Peace Notes: Live in Venice (2008)

Tribute albums

 The Big Gundown by John Zorn (1985)
 The Film Music Collection of Ennio Morricone by pianist Richard Clayderman (1990)
 Pearls - Amii Stewart Sings Ennio Morricone by Amii Stewart (1990)
 Cinema Italiano (1991) by Henry Mancini
 Morricone by saxophonist Nobuya Sugawa (1998)
 Trilogy Plays Ennio Morricone by Tristan Schulze, Daisy Joplin and Aleksey Igudesman (1998)
 The Fantastic Movie Story of Ennio Morricone by pianist Richard Clayderman (1999)
 For a Few Guitars More - A Tribute to Morricone's Spaghetti Western Themes by various artists (2002)
 Enrico Pieranunzi, Marc Johnson, Joey Baron Play Morricone (2002)
 Dear Morricone by violinist Tatsuya Yabe (2003)
 Ennio Morricone: Tribute for Piano Produced & Arranged by Jeff & Carmen Kidwell. Played by Ron Chiles (2003)
 Roman by erhuist Jia Peng Fang (2003)
 Enrico Pieranunzi, Marc Johnson, Joey Baron Play Morricone 2 (2003)
 Le Romanze di Morricone by flautist Kaori Fujii (2003)
 Yo-Yo Ma Plays Ennio Morricone (2004)
 My Favourite Ennio Morricone Music presented by Junichiro Koizumi, former prime minister of Japan (2006)
 Di Domenico Plays Morricone (2007)
 We All Love Ennio Morricone by various artists (2007)

Selected songs 

All music composed by Ennio Morricone, lyrics written by various artists.

Other song compositions 

 1961 – Faccio finta di dormire and Cicciona cha cha by Edoardo Vianello (lyrics by Carlo Rossi)
 1962 – Quello che conta by Luigi Tenco (lyrics by Luciano Salce)
 1963 – Pel di carota by Rita Pavone (lyrics by Franco Migliacci)
 1963 – Nel corso by Gino Paoli (lyrics by Lina Wertmüller)
 1963 – Ti ho conosciuto by Rita Pavone
 1964 – Lonesome Billy by Peter Tevis
 1964 – Domani prendo il primo treno by Paul Anka
 1965 – L'amore gira by Rosy
 1965 – Penso a te by Catherine Spaak
 1965 – Le cose più importanti by Pierfilippi
 1965 – Ho messo gli occhi su di te by Dino & Anna Moffo
 1965 – Questi vent'anni miei by Catherine Spaak
 1966 – Uccellacci e uccellini by Domenico Modugno
 1967 – Vai via malinconia by Maysa Matarazzo
 1968 – Scirocco by Renato Rascel
 1968 – Canzone della libertà by Sergio Endrigo
 1968 – Filastrocca vietnamita by Sergio Endrigo
 1969 – Una breve stagione by Sergio Endrigo
 1971 – Ho visto un film by Gianni Morandi
 1989 – Libera l'amore by Zucchero

All songs composed by Ennio Morricone, lyrics written by various artists.

Selected music certifications

References

External links 
 
 Ennio Morricone at Soundtrackguide.net
 Ennio Morricone (Unofficial) Fans Club
 The Ennio Morricone Fanpage
 Ennio Morricone Myspace
 The Ennio Morricone Online Community
 Ennio Morricone Japanese website
 
 Ennio Morricone Discography at SoundtrackCollector.com

Film and television discographies
Discographies of Italian artists
Compositions
Lists of compositions by composer